William Whipple, Jr. (1909–2007) was a brigadier general of the U.S. Army, who played a significant role in the development of the Marshall Plan. He was also the chief engineer for the construction of the 1964 New York World's Fair, and a recognized authority on water resources, having written more than 100 books and articles on water supply, navigation, flood control, and power generation.

Whipple was a 1930 graduate of West Point. He was also a graduate of Princeton University and a Rhodes Scholar. He served on Eisenhower's staff in World War II.

References
Obituary, Town Topics 

1909 births
2007 deaths
American Rhodes Scholars
United States Military Academy alumni
Princeton University alumni
American people of World War II
Aftermath of World War II in the United States
United States Army generals